Hexurella is a genus of spiders, found in the United States and Mexico. It is the only genus in the family Hexurellidae.

Species
, the World Spider Catalog accepted the following species:

Hexurella apachea Gertsch & Platnick, 1979 – US
Hexurella encina Gertsch & Platnick, 1979 – Mexico
Hexurella pinea Gertsch & Platnick, 1979 (type species) – US
Hexurella rupicola Gertsch & Platnick, 1979 – US

References

Mygalomorphae genera
Mygalomorphae